Stereoscape Ltd. is an extended reality startup company with headquarters in Helsinki. The company designs and builds interactive and immersive 3D, AR and VR solutions for companies. The goal of the solutions is to help people learn faster and work smarter to drive productivity, sustainability and business growth.

Stereoscape's team consists of AR & VR experts working together with a network of international partners. The company tailors its solutions to the customer needs.

Solutions 
Stereoscape's solution offerings can be divided into three categories:

 Sales & Marketing
 Operations & Maintenance
 Learning & Training

In the past Stereoscape has created solutions for brands like Nokia, Valmet, Wärtsilä and F-Secure.

History 
Stereoscape was founded in 2009. The company started in the field of stereoscopic 3D conversions of films and later progressed to glasses-free 3D technologies. Stereoscape was part of the process of stereoscopic conversion of the movie Moomins and the Comet Chase. In 2015 Stereoscape started creating extended reality solutions with the focus more on the interactive content. In 2020 more solution portfolios were created to answer the changing demands on the market because of the coronavirus pandemic.

References

External links
https://www.stereoscape.com www.stereoscape.com

Finnish companies established in 2009
Companies based in Helsinki